Lewis Vaughan Lodge (21 December 1872 – 21 October 1916) was an English footballer who represented the England national football team. He also played first-class cricket with Hampshire.

Sporting career
Lodge, a left- or right-back, made his England debut in a win over Wales in 1894. He played Wales again in 1895 as well as an international against Scotland, and in 1896 he was a member of the English side which beat Ireland, before earning his fifth and final cap in a loss to Scotland later that year. The defender may or may not have captained England in their 1896 encounter with Ireland; primary sources give the captaincy to either Gilbert Smith, George Raikes or Lodge.

At club level, Lodge played for both Cambridge University and the Corinthians. In 1896, Small Heath F.C. persuaded him to play for them; to their disappointment, teaching commitments at Harris Hill School in Newbury restricted him to a single appearance, on 29 February 1896 in a 2–1 defeat of Blackburn Rovers in the First Division of the Football League. Described as "a powerfully-built back of the old school brigade", he was reliable both at kicking the ball and at tackling.

He was a decent cricketer too, appearing in three first-class matches for Hampshire, all in 1900. He also played in the Minor Counties Championship for Durham.

Personal
Lodge was born in Aycliffe, near Darlington, in County Durham, and was educated at Durham School. His brother-in-law, Charlie Adamson, played rugby for the British and Irish Lions and also played Minor Counties cricket. Lodge died in Burbage, Derbyshire, aged 43, in unexplained circumstances, being found drowned in a pool.

References

External links
Cricinfo: Lewis Lodge

1872 births
1916 deaths
People from Newton Aycliffe
Footballers from County Durham
English footballers
England international footballers
Association football fullbacks
Cambridge University A.F.C. players
Corinthian F.C. players
Birmingham City F.C. players
Newbury Town F.C. players
English Football League players
English cricketers
Hampshire cricketers
Durham cricketers
Deaths by drowning in the United Kingdom
People educated at Durham School